Robert Steinberg (May 25, 1922, Soroca, Bessarabia, Romania (present-day Moldova) – May 25, 2014) was a mathematician at the University of California, Los Angeles.

He introduced the Steinberg representation, the Lang–Steinberg theorem, the Steinberg group in algebraic K-theory, Steinberg's formula in representation theory, and the Steinberg groups in Lie theory that yield finite simple groups over finite fields.

Biography
Born in Soroca (then in the Kingdom of Romania, today in Moldova), Steinberg's parents settled in Canada very soon after his birth.

Steinberg studied under Richard Brauer and he received his Ph.D. in mathematics from the University of Toronto in 1948. Steinberg joined the Mathematics Department at UCLA the same year. He retired from UCLA in 1992.

Awards
Steinberg was an invited speaker at the International Congress of Mathematicians in 1966, won the Steele Prize in 1985, was elected to the United States National Academy of Sciences in 1985, and won the Jeffery–Williams Prize in 1990. In 2003, the Journal of Algebra published a special issue to celebrate Robert Steinberg's 80th birthday.

Selected publications
 
 
 
 
 
 
 

 
R. Steinberg, Collected Papers, Amer. Math. Soc. (1997), .

References

External links
 

1922 births
2014 deaths
People from Soroca
Moldovan Jews
Bessarabian Jews
Romanian emigrants to Canada
Canadian people of Moldovan-Jewish descent
American people of Moldovan-Jewish descent
Group theorists
Jewish American scientists
Canadian mathematicians
20th-century American mathematicians
21st-century American mathematicians
University of Toronto alumni
University of California, Los Angeles faculty
Members of the United States National Academy of Sciences
Canadian emigrants to the United States
21st-century American Jews